Guadalupe de la Cruz López Botero (born 12 January 1987) is a Colombian rugby sevens player. She played at the 2015 Pan Am Games. López was selected for the Colombia women's national rugby sevens team to the 2016 Summer Olympics.

References

External links 
 

1987 births
Living people
Female rugby sevens players
Rugby sevens players at the 2015 Pan American Games
Rugby sevens players at the 2016 Summer Olympics
Colombia international rugby sevens players
Olympic rugby sevens players of Colombia
Pan American Games competitors for Colombia
Colombia international women's rugby sevens players
21st-century Colombian women